Petrich Peak is an ice-covered peak of elevation 760 m in central Bowles Ridge on Livingston Island in the South Shetland Islands, Antarctica, which is named after the town of Petrich in Southwestern Bulgaria.

Location
The peak is located at m which is 400 m east of Ticha Peak, 1.98 km southwest of Melnik Peak, and 1.25 km west of the summit of Asparuh Peak (Bulgarian topographic survey Tangra 2004/05).

Maps
 L.L. Ivanov et al. Antarctica: Livingston Island and Greenwich Island, South Shetland Islands. Scale 1:100000 topographic map. Sofia: Antarctic Place-names Commission of Bulgaria, 2005.
 L.L. Ivanov. Antarctica: Livingston Island and Greenwich, Robert, Snow and Smith Islands. Scale 1:120000 topographic map.  Troyan: Manfred Wörner Foundation, 2009.

References
 Petrich Peak. SCAR Composite Gazetteer of Antarctica.
 Bulgarian Antarctic Gazetteer. Antarctic Place-names Commission. (details in Bulgarian, basic data in English)

Mountains of Livingston Island
Bulgaria and the Antarctic